The Ruins of Saint Paul's are the ruins of a 17th-century Catholic religious complex in Santo António, Macau, China. They include what was originally St. Paul's College and the Church of St. Paul (Igreja de São Paulo) also known as "Mater Dei", a 17th-century Portuguese church dedicated to Saint Paul the Apostle. Today, the ruins are one of Macau's best known landmarks and one of the Seven Wonders of Portuguese Origin in the World. In 2005, they were officially listed as part of the Historic Centre of Macau, a UNESCO World Heritage Site.

History 

Built from 1602 to 1640  by the Jesuits, the church was one of the largest Catholic churches in Asia at the time. With the decline in importance of Macau, which was overtaken as the main port for the Pearl River Delta by Hong Kong, the building's fortunes similarly ebbed, and it was destroyed by a fire during a typhoon on 26January 1835. The Fortaleza do Monte overlooks the ruin. This could have been due to Francesco Melzi showing the codex to Carlo Spinola in Milan or by the architect Giacomo della Porta (connected to Leonardo's Codex, formerly Codex Leicester, now owned by Bill Gates) who designed the façade of the Church of the Gesù in Rome.

Characteristics

The ruins now consist of the southern stone façade—intricately carved between 1620 and 1627 by Japanese Christians in exile from their homeland and local craftsmen under the direction of Italian Jesuit Carlo Spinola—and the crypts of the Jesuits who established and maintained the church. The façade sits on a small hill, with 68 stone steps leading up to it. The carvings include Jesuit images with Oriental themes, such as The Blessed Virgin Mary stepping on a seven-headed hydra, described in Chinese characters as 'Holy Mother tramples the heads of the dragon'. A few of the other carvings are of the founders of the Jesuit Order, the conquest of Death by Jesus, and at the very top, a dove with wings outstretched.

Conservation
Resisting calls for the dangerously leaning structure to be demolished, from 1990 to 1995, the ruins were excavated under the auspices of the Instituto Cultural de Macau to study its historic past. The crypt and the foundations were uncovered, revealing the architectural plan of the building. Numerous religious artifacts were also found together with the relics of the Chinese Christian martyrs and the monastic clergy, including the founder of the Jesuit college in Macau, Father Alessandro Valignano.

The ruins were restored by the Macanese government into a museum, and the façade is now buttressed with concrete and steel in a way which preserves the aesthetic integrity of the façade. There was once a steel stairway that allowed tourists to climb up to the top of the façade from the rear, but due to concerns for the preservation of the church, tourists are no longer allowed to climb up.

See also 

 Museum of Sacred Art and Crypt
 Religion in Macau
 List of Jesuit sites

References

Gallery 

Roman Catholic churches in Macau
Historic Centre of Macau
Jesuit churches in China
Ruins in Macau
Religious buildings and structures completed in 1640
Roman Catholic cathedrals in Macau
Catholic Church in Macau
Christianity in Macau
Macau Peninsula
Portuguese Macau
Tourist attractions in Macau
Burned buildings and structures in China
1640 establishments in China
1640 establishments in the Portuguese Empire
17th-century establishments in Macau
Portuguese colonial architecture in China